The following lists events that happened during 1921 in the Belgian Congo.

Incumbent
 Governor-general – Eugène Henry, then Maurice Lippens

Events

See also

 Belgian Congo
 History of the Democratic Republic of the Congo

References

Sources

 
Belgian Congo
Belgian Congo